Nomreh may refer to:
 Nomreh 1
 Nomreh 1-e Bala
 Nomreh 1-e Pain
 Nomreh 2, Haftgel
 Nomreh 2, Omidiyeh
 Nomreh 3
 Nomreh 5
 Nomreh 9, Ramhormoz
 Nomreh 11
 Nomreh 12